Arnold von Harff (1471 in Castell Harff, Bedburg – January 1505) was a German traveler from the 15th century, from Köln. He went on pilgrimage to many countries, collecting both languages and cultural information. He wrote about a number of languages during his travels (1496-1499) : Breton, Croatian, Turkish, Basque, Hebrew, Arabic, Albanian, Hungarian, Syriac, Amharic, and Armenian.

References

 , Le breton d'Arnold von Harff, H. Champion, 1911
 Malcolm Henry Ikin Letts, Eberhard von Groote, The Pilgrimage of Arnold von Harff, knight: from Cologne through Italy, Syria, Egypt, Arabia, Ethiopia, Nubia, Palestine, Turkey, France, and Spain, which he accomplished in the years 1496 to 1499, Hakluyt Society, 1946
 "Le breton d'Arnold Von Harff", Celticum, Nnn 22, 1975
 "Aux origines du breton: Le glossaire vannetais du Chevalier Arnold von Harff, voyageur allemand du XVème siècle", Ogam-Celticum, 1984, 26, Christian-J. Guyonvarc'h
 "La ville chez Arnold Von Harff", by Annie Faugère in ''La Ville: du réel à l'imaginaire : actes du colloque de Rouen, 8-10 novembre 1988, volume 162 of Publications de l'Université de Rouen, 

Breton language
Holy Land travellers
German travel writers
German male non-fiction writers
1471 births
1505 deaths